The 1868 United States presidential election in Georgia took place on November 3, 1868, as part of the wider United States presidential election. Voters chose 9 representatives, or electors, to the Electoral College, who voted for president and vice president.

Background
The first readmission of Georgia to the Union occurred in 1868.

Vote
The Seymour/Blair ticket carried the state of Georgia on election day.

With 64.27% of the popular vote, Georgia would be Seymour's fourth strongest victory in terms of percentage in the popular vote after Kentucky, Louisiana and Maryland.

Results

References

Notes

Georgia
1868
1868 Georgia (U.S. state) elections